Mycovellosiella is a genus of fungi belonging to the family Mycosphaerellaceae.

The species of this genus are found in Europe, northern America and Australia.

The genus was circumscribed by Eugenio dos Santos Rangel in Arch. Jard. Bot. Rio de Janeiro vol.2 on page 71 in 1917.

The genus name of Mycovellosiella is in honour of José Mariano de Conceição Vellozo (1742–1811), who was a Colonial Brazilian botanist who catalogued plant specimens.

Species
As accepted by Species Fungorum;

 Mycovellosiella adinae 
 Mycovellosiella adinicola 
 Mycovellosiella aegles 
 Mycovellosiella ambrosiae 
 Mycovellosiella atylosae-scarabaeoides 
 Mycovellosiella bellynckii 
 Mycovellosiella brideliae 
 Mycovellosiella clausenae 
 Mycovellosiella costeroana 
 Mycovellosiella cucurbiticola 
 Mycovellosiella deightonii 
 Mycovellosiella fici-cuneae 
 Mycovellosiella gorakhpurensis 
 Mycovellosiella hyalofilispora 
 Mycovellosiella hymenodictyi 
 Mycovellosiella iresines 
 Mycovellosiella litseae 
 Mycovellosiella malvastri 
 Mycovellosiella minax 
 Mycovellosiella mucunae 
 Mycovellosiella myrtacearum 
 Mycovellosiella oryzae 
 Mycovellosiella paradoxa 
 Mycovellosiella phaseoli 
 Mycovellosiella pseudoidium 
 Mycovellosiella pyri 
 Mycovellosiella pyrina 
 Mycovellosiella robbsii 
 Mycovellosiella rosea 
 Mycovellosiella rubiacearum 
 Mycovellosiella sidae 
 Mycovellosiella terminaliae 
 Mycovellosiella verbascifolii 
 Mycovellosiella viticis 

Former species; (most are in Mycosphaerellaceae family)
 
 M. abscondita  = Passalora abscondita
 M. acalyphae  = Passalora acalyphae 
 M. acericola  = Passalora acericola
 M. acori  = Passalora acori
 M. ahmesii  = Passalora ahmesii
 M. anamirtae  = Pseudocercospora anamirtae
 M. anomala  = Passalora anomala
 M. antidesmatis  = Pseudocercospora ghissambilae
 M. ariae  = Passalora ariae
 M. arthraxonis  = Passalora arthraxonis
 M. asprellae  = Passalora asprellae
 M. atylosiae  = Passalora atylosiae
 M. atylosiae  = Mycovellosiella atylosae-scarabaeoides
 M. bartholomei  = Passalora bartholomei
 M. bastardiae  = Passalora bastardiae
 M. bauhiniae  = Passalora bauhiniae
 M. berkheyae  = Passalora berkheyae
 M. berkheyae-maritimae  = Passalora berkheyae-maritimae
 M. biformis  = Passalora biformis
 M. boldoae  = Passalora boldoae
 M. brachycarpa  = Distomycovellosiella brachycarpa
 M. broussonetiae  = Passalora broussonetiae
 M. buddlejae  = Passalora buddlejae M. cajani  = Passalora cajani M. cajani var. indica  = Passalora cajani M. cajani var. trichophila  = Passalora cajani M. carlinae  = Passalora carlinae M. caseariae  = Pseudocercospora caseariae-tomentosae M. cayaponiae  = Passalora cayaponiae M. celtidicola  = Passalora celtidicola M. christianae  = Passalora christianae M. clematidis  = Passalora clematidina M. clerodendri  = Passalora clerodendri M. codonopsidis  = Passalora codonopsidis M. colebrookiae  = Pseudocercospora colebrookiae-oppositifoliae M. concors  = Passalora concors M. consimilis  = Passalora consimilis M. convolvuli  = Passalora convolvuli M. cordiicola  = Pseudocercospora cordiicola M. corni  = Passalora cornicola M. costaricensis  = Passalora costaricensis M. curvispora  = Passalora curvispora M. dalbergiae  = Passalora dalbergiae M. delicatissima  = Passalora delicatissima M. desmodiicola  = Pseudocercospora desmodiicola M. dichondrae  = Passalora dichondrae M. dioscoreae  = Passalora dioscoreae-nipponicae M. dioscoreicola  = Passalora dioscoreigena M. dombeyae  = Passalora dombeyae M. dulcamarae  = Passalora dulcamarae M. duplicans  = Passalora duplicans M. elaeochroma  = Passalora elaeochroma M. eucalypti  = Coremiopassalora eucalypti M. eupatorii-odorati  = Phaeoramularia eupatorii-odorati M. eupatorii-odorati var. asteracearum  = Phaeoramularia eupatorii-odorati M. ferruginea  = Ragnhildiana ferruginea M. fici  = Pseudocercospora fici-hispidae M. flexuosa  = Passalora flexuosa M. fujikuroi  = Passalora fujikuroi M. fulva  = Fulvia fulva M. gentianae  = Passalora gentianae M. gliricidiae  = Passalora gliricidiae M. gmelinae-arboreae  = Passalora gmelinae-arboreae M. gonatoclada  = Passalora gonatoclada M. gonatoclada  = Passalora gonatoclada M. gonostegiae  = Passalora gonostegiae M. greciana  = Passalora greciana M. grewiae  = Passalora grewiae M. hamamelidis  = Passalora hamamelidis M. haplophragmatis  = Pseudocercospora haplophragmatis M. hariotii  = Passalora hariotii M. helianthi  = Passalora helianthi M. holobrunnea  = Passalora holobrunnea M. hughesii  = Passalora hughesii; Mycosphaerellaceae
 M. imperatae  = Passalora imperatae M. incarnata  = Passalora incarnata M. indica  = Passalora miliusae M. isotomae  = Passalora isotomae M. koepkei  = Passalora koepkei M. lactucae  = Passalora lactucae M. lantanae  = Passalora lantanae M. lantanae var. cubensis  = Passalora lantanae M. lantanae var. verbenacearum  = Passalora lantanae M. lantaniphila  = Passalora lantaniphila M. latispora  = Passalora latispora M. laxa  = Passalora laxa M. lobeliae-cardinalis  = Passalora lobeliae-cardinalis M. maclurae  = Ramularia maclurae M. malloti  = Pseudocercospora malloti M. malloti-repandi  = Pseudocercospora malloti-repandi M. malvacearum  = Passalora malvacearum M. manaosensis  = Passalora manaosensis M. maughaniae  = Pseudocercospora flemingiae-macrophyllae M. merremiae  = Passalora merremiae M. mikaniae  = Passalora mikaniae M. mitragynae  = Passalora mitragynae M. monrosii  = Passalora monrosii M. moracearum  = Pseudocercospora ficigena M. murina  = Passalora murina M. myracrodruonis  = Passalora myracrodruonis M. nattrassii  = Passalora nattrassii M. nerii-indici  = Passalora nerii-indici M. nervisequens  = Passalora nervisequens M. nopomingensis  = Passalora nopomingensis M. paspali  = Ramularia paspali M. passaloroides  = Paramycovellosiella passaloroides M. paulowniicola  = Passalora paulowniicola M. peixotoae  = Passalora peixotoae M. perfoliati  = Ragnhildiana perfoliati M. perfoliati var. nepalensis  = Ragnhildiana perfoliati M. philadelphi  = Passalora philadelphi M. pilophila  = Passalora pilophila M. pilosae  = Passalora pilosae M. piperis  = Passalora piperis M. pirozynskii  = Passalora pirozynskii M. pithecellobii  = Passalora pithecellobii M. poasensis  = Passalora poasensis M. pongamiae  = Passalora pongamiicola M. prenanthis  = Passalora prenanthis M. psidii  = Passalora psidiicola M. pteridis  = Passalora pteridis M. puerariae  = Passalora puerariae M. pumila  = Passalora pumila M. pyricola  = Passalora pyrophila M. raveneliae  = Passalora raveneliae M. rhois  = Passalora rhoina M. rhois  = Passalora guoana M. rosae  = Passalora rosigena M. rufidula  = Passalora rufidula M. salicis  = Passalora salicis M. sidarum  = Passalora sidarum M. solanacearum  = Passalora solanacearum M. solani-torvi  = Passalora solani-torvi M. solenae-heterophyllae  = Pseudocercospora solenae-heterophyllae M. subhyalina  = Passalora subhyalina M. sublateritia  = Passalora sublateritia M. subrufa  = Pseudocercospora subrufa M. taiwanensis  = Saccharicola taiwanensis, Phaeosphaeriaceae
 M. tarrii  = Passalora tarrii M. tasmaniensis  = Parapenidiella tasmaniensis, Teratosphaeriaceae
 M. telaria  = Passalora telaria M. teucrii  = Passalora teucrii M. toxicodendri  = Cercosporella toxicodendri M. trijugae  = Zasmidium trijugae M. triseptispora  = Passalora triseptispora M. triumfettae  = Passalora triumfettae M. tryphostemmatis  = Passalora tryphostemmatis M. turbinae  = Passalora turbinae M. tylophorae  = Passalora tylophorae M. urariae  = Pseudocercospora urariae-hamosae M. vaginae  = Passalora vaginae M. venturioides  = Passalora venturioides M. verbesinae  = Passalora verbesinae M. vitis  = Passalora vitis-piadezkii M. vitis-ripariae  = Passalora vitis-ripariae M. xenogrewiae  = Passalora xenogrewiae M. zanthoxyli  = Passalora zanthoxyli M. ziziphi  = Passalora ziziphicola''

References

Mycosphaerellaceae
Mycosphaerellaceae genera